Seo Mi-Jung (born 10 February 1980) is a South Korean foil fencer.

Seo won the bronze medal in the foil team event at the 2006 World Fencing Championships after beating Poland in the bronze medal match. She accomplished this with her teammates Jeon Hee-Sok, Jung Gil-Ok and Nam Hyun-Hee. She also competed at the 2000 Summer Olympics in the individual foil event.

Achievements
 2005 World Fencing Championships, team foil
 2006 World Fencing Championships, team foil

References

1980 births
Living people
South Korean female fencers
Place of birth missing (living people)
Olympic fencers of South Korea
Fencers at the 2000 Summer Olympics
Asian Games medalists in fencing
Fencers at the 2002 Asian Games
Fencers at the 2006 Asian Games
Fencers at the 2010 Asian Games
Asian Games gold medalists for South Korea
Asian Games silver medalists for South Korea
Asian Games bronze medalists for South Korea
Medalists at the 2002 Asian Games
Medalists at the 2006 Asian Games
Medalists at the 2010 Asian Games
21st-century South Korean women